Guanshaling station is an interchange station for Changsha Metro Line 4 and Changsha–Zhuzhou–Xiangtan intercity railway.

China Railway 

Guanshaling station is a railway station in Yuelu District, Changsha, Hunan, China, operated by CR Guangzhou. It opened its services on 26 December 2017. Guanshaling station offers interchange to the Changsha Metro Line 4.

Changsha Metro 
Guanshaling station is a subway station in Yuelu District, Changsha, Hunan, China, operated by the Changsha subway operator Changsha Metro. Construction began on July 13, 2015. The station opened on 26 May 2019. Guanshaling Station offers interchange to the Changsha-Zhuzhou-Xiangtan Intercity Railway.

Layout 
The station has one island platform.

Surrounding area
 Guanshaling Park
 Shijiagang Aquatic Park
 Changsha Municipal Government
 Changsha Municipal People's Procuratorate
 Changsha Municipal Archives Bureau
 Hunan Provincial  Writers Association
 Changsha Municipal Letters and Visits Bureau

References

Railway stations in Hunan
Railway stations in China opened in 2017